Stewart Buttar (1954-2006) was a New Zealand international lawn bowler and national coach.

Bowls career
Buttar won a bronze medal at the 1994 Commonwealth Games in the fours event in Victoria, British Columbia, Canada with Bruce McNish, Peter Belliss and Rowan Brassey.

He was a New Zealand National Bowls Championships champion, a feat matched by his son Nick Buttar. In all Buttar won three National titles; the singles in 1994 and the pairs in 1993 & 1994.

Coaching
Stewart Buttar later became the national coach of the New Zealand team but died in 2006 from cancer.

References

New Zealand male bowls players
1954 births
2006 deaths
Sportspeople from Dunedin
Commonwealth Games medallists in lawn bowls
Commonwealth Games bronze medallists for New Zealand
Bowls players at the 1994 Commonwealth Games
20th-century New Zealand people
21st-century New Zealand people
Medallists at the 1994 Commonwealth Games